Mempelaspidina is a subtribe of armored scale insects.

Genera
Mempelaspis

References

Lepidosaphidini